The Bangladeshi national cricket team visited Pakistan in April 2008 and played a five-match Limited Overs International (LOI) series which Pakistan won 5–0. Bangladesh were captained by Mohammad Ashraful and Pakistan by Shoaib Malik.

References

2008 in Bangladeshi cricket
2008 in Pakistani cricket
Bangladeshi cricket tours of Pakistan
International cricket competitions in 2007–08
Pakistani cricket seasons from 2000–01